Michael Curtis McCrary (born July 7, 1970) is a former American football player who was defensive end for the Seattle Seahawks and the Baltimore Ravens for ten seasons in the National Football League (NFL) between 1993 and 2002. McCrary was a two-time Pro Bowler in 1998 and 1999. McCrary was inducted to the Ravens Ring of Honor in 2004. McCrary is now doing commentary for the Ravens on WBAL-AM.

Early years
When McCrary was a young boy his mother wanted to place him in a day care which was located across the street from his home.  However, it wasn't racially integrated and she sued the day care to allow Michael's admittance. The case went to the United States Supreme Court Runyon v. McCrary in 1976. One of the justices who dissented was former football star Byron "Whizzer" White; a quarter-century later, in 2000, McCrary won the Byron "Whizzer" White NFL Man of the Year Award. He later attended George C. Marshall High School in Fairfax County, Virginia.

College career
McCrary played college football at Wake Forest University from 1989–92, setting school records for sacks in a season (16) and in a career (30), records he still holds.

When being scouted by NFL scouts they found his vertical leap was measured at 36 inches; and at 250 pounds, he came in at 4.59 seconds in the 40-yard sprint.

Professional career

McCrary was drafted in the seventh round by the Seattle Seahawks in the 1993 NFL Draft. He spent four seasons  as a defensive end as well as playing on special teams before signing with Baltimore following the 1996 season.

McCrary started all 16 games with the Ravens at defensive end during the 1998 season. That season, he lead the team in quarterback sacks, and he finished second on the team in tackles. He was elected to the Pro Bowl along with five other Ravens' teammates, Bennie Thompson, Peter Boulware, Jermaine Lewis, Ray Lewis, and Jonathan Ogden. 

In 1999, he again started all 16 games for the Ravens, and was elected to his second Pro Bowl. The following season, McCrary would again start all 16 games as the Ravens would have one of the greatest statistical defenses in NFL history, finishing 12-4 and allowing an NFL record 10.3 points per game. In the playoffs, McCrary would have 6 sacks, including 2 in Super Bowl XXXV, which McCrary and the Ravens won 34-7.

Due to various injuries, McCrary retired in August 2003, ending his stint with the Ravens. McCrary finished 2nd on franchise sack list with 51 sacks, now 3rd behind Terrell Suggs (125 QB sacks) and Peter Boulware (70 QB sacks).

References

1970 births
Living people
American football defensive ends
Seattle Seahawks players
Baltimore Ravens players
American Conference Pro Bowl players
Wake Forest Demon Deacons football players
People from Vienna, Virginia
Sportspeople from Fairfax County, Virginia
Players of American football from Virginia